The Blackburn B-2 was a biplane side-by-side trainer aircraft designed and produced by the British aviation manufacturer Blackburn Aircraft.

It was designed as a successor to the Bluebird IV and was derived from it, thus the two aircraft shared much of their design. One major difference of the B-2 was its semi-monocoque all-metal fuselage, which was similar to that of the Blackburn Segrave touring aircraft. On 10 December 1931, the prototype B-2 performed its maiden flight at Brough. It had excellent manoeuvrability and responsive flying controls, and was a relatively forgiving aircraft in flight. During early 1932, the first production aircraft made its first flight, and was participating in competitive air races as early as June of that year.

While Blackburn had ambitions to sell the B-2 as a military trainer, the only military airwing to adopt it was the Royal Air Force (RAF) as a part of its expansion programme. It was also flown by numerous civilian flying schools during the 1930s; these aircraft continued to be used into the Second World War as trainers. During February 1942, the remaining B-2s were transferred to the RAF for use by the Air Training Corps (ATC) as instructional aides. Only two aircraft survived through to the postwar era. By the twenty-first century, a single B-2 is still maintained in a flightworthy condition as a part of the Shuttleworth Collection.

Development

Background
The B-2 was developed by Blackburn during the early 1930s as a successor for its earlier Bluebird IV trainer. It retained the same basic configuration, such as the side-by-side seating arrangement, present on the earlier aircraft, but principally differed in that it was redesigned with a semi-monocoque all-metal fuselage in place of the metal and fabric-covered counterpart. According the aviation author Audrey Jackson, the new fuselage was designed using the same principles as those used for the Blackburn Segrave touring aircraft, and possessed remarkable strength for the era, allowing it to better endure rough landings and poor handling (which was commonplace while flown by inexperienced pilots). The structure comprised a series of hollow frames reinforced by light stringers and diagonal steel tubes. The exterior surface was composed of Alclad, which was stiffened three longitudinal swagings; there was no use of welding or wire bracing at any point of the fuselage.

The single-bay biplane wings were of similar to those of the Bluebird IV, including its steel and duralumin structure, and could be folded for easy storage. Leading edge slots were fitted to the upper wing to improve low-speed handling, while ailerons were only present on the lower wings. The outer wing panels folded around the hinges of the rear spar. The fuel system was gravity fed from a 22-gallon aerofoil tank positioned above the fuselage on six struts. The tail unit was of a similar construction to the mainplanes, its span was increased in comparison to that of the Blackbird IV, and also featured a horn balanced rudder; furthermore, the elevator could be trimmed using an adjustable via spring-loading, controlled via a lever in the cockpit.

It featured a conventional undercarriage that was fixed in place. The mainwheels were set wide apart and divided, being supported on telescopic legs that incorporated steel springs with oil dampers. On the underside of the rear fuselage, almost directly below the tail unit, was a sprung tailskid. The engine, of which various models could be fitted, was fixed upon a tubular steel mounting attached directly to a fireproof bulkhead; a 2.5 gallon oil tank was mounted beneath these bearers. Cooling air entered via the front of the fuselage, passed across the engine, and exited via fluting built into the fuselage after of the engine bay.

Into flight

On 10 December 1931, the prototype B-2 (registered G-ABUW) performed its maiden flight at Brough. On 27 June 1932, it made its first public appearance at the Society of British Aerospace Companies's airshow at Hendon Aerodrome; ten days later, it participated in the King's Cup air race around England, alongside the first production aircraft (registered G-ABWI), finishing in 18th and 19th place respectively. There was relatively little difference between the two aircraft, save for the latter having been outfitted with a metal propeller sourced from Fairey-Reed. In March 1933, having completed testing and participated in numerous demonstration flights, the prototype was put to use at the Brough Reserve School as a routine trainer aircraft alongside several other production aircraft.

The prototype was powered by a single de Havilland Gipsy III engine, capable of. The subsequent production aircraft were equipped with either the  de Havilland Gipsy Major and 120 hp Cirrus Hermes IV engines were also fitted to production aircraft. The prototype proved to be relatively trouble-free during flight testing, it was also found to be very manoeuvrable. It was also relatively forgiving on its pilots, even while taxiing with strong winds present, while the controls remained effective even just above stalling speeds; it was also easy to sideslip for positioning prior to landing. During early 1932, the first production aircraft made its first flight.

Operational history

Blackburn chose to market the B-2 primarily towards the military trainer market. For this purpose, the prototype B-2 was shipped to Lisbon for evaluation by Portugal during September 1932. Although the aircraft reportedly performed well in this evaluation and drew some favourable comments from the reviewing officials, the Portuguese had a preference for a tandem cockpit layout, and ultimately opted to procure the rival de Havilland Tiger Moth trainer instead.

To raise the B-2's profile amongst the general public and potential buyers, numerous aircraft were participated in various air races and aerobatic displays to demonstrate its capabilities. In the Grimsby News Race of June 1933, one B-2 piloted by T. Neville Stack was able to secure second place, having attained an average speed of 93 mph; during the Kings Cup air race of July 1934, another, piloted by H. M. David, came in second place with an average speed of 112.75 mph.

The B-2 would not ever become a successful export product amongst the various international military airwings, however, Blackburn opted to continue production of the type to equip various civilian flying schools across the United Kingdom that were increasingly being engaged in the training of pilots for the Royal Air Force under the RAF expansion scheme. Several of these B-2 equipped flying schools were actually owned by Blackburn, such as those at Brough Aerodrome and London Air Park, Hanworth. A total of 42 B-2s, including the prototype, were produced, with production continuing until 1937.

The final three B-2s were sold to the Air Ministry and promptly issued to the Brough flying school, where they were operated in RAF markings.

On the outbreak of the Second World War, all of the B-2s based at Hanworth were moved to Brough, where the two training schools merged, becoming No. 4 Elementary Flying Training School. The school at Brough continued to be operated by Blackburn while its aircraft continuing to operate under civilian registrations (although they were repainted with wartime training markings with yellow fuselages, camouflaged wings and RAF roundels). During February 1942, the remaining aircraft were transferred to the RAF, where they were assigned to the Air Training Corps (ATC). However, the ATC did not typically fly the type, instead opting to use their B-2s as instructional airframes. Several of these airframes would still be used for instruction purposes over 20 years later.

Operators

 Royal Air Force
 No. 4 EFTS

Survivors

Only two B-2s survived to fly in the postwar era; one of these was lost in a crash on 16 June 1951. The sole survivor (G-AEBJ) has been preserved and was originally maintained in airworthy condition by Blackburn (which was absorbed into British Aerospace during the 1970s). By 2007, G-AEBJ was located with the Shuttleworth Collection at Old Warden.

Another fuselage was for many years seen up a tree in an Essex scrapyard before being rescued in the 1980s. This aircraft displays two identities, G-ACBH and G-ADFO, and is preserved, still wearing its original paint, at the South Yorkshire Aircraft Museum.

Specifications (B-2)

See also

References

Citations

Bibliography

External links

 Audio recording of the Blackburn B2

1930s British civil trainer aircraft
B-02
Single-engined tractor aircraft
Biplanes